Julian Kay (born August 1974) is a British actor who is best known for playing PC Tom Allen in Season 5 & Season 6 of BBC One drama Dangerfield. Other roles include Mr Green in two series of ITV's adaptation of Jacqueline Wilson's Girls In Love and Tracy Barlow's husband Robert Preston in Coronation Street.

He is also known for his roles as Gary Williams in Ackley Bridge and Toby Jackson in Emmerdale.

Kay attended Bootham School in York, England, before training at the University of Birmingham and Guildford School of Acting.

Kay is married to British actress Kate Hampson and lives in York. They have two children.

Filmography

References

External links

1974 births
Living people
English male television actors
English male soap opera actors
English male radio actors
English male voice actors
Male actors from York
Guildford School of Acting